The European Junior Curling Championships is an annual curling bonspiel held from 1983 to 1987 in the World Curling Federation's Europe zone. The championships feature curlers (women's teams only) under the age of 21 competing to qualify for a spot in the World Junior Curling Championships. Nations that participate are those which have not already qualified for the World Junior Championships. Later, from 2005 to 2016 replaced by European Junior Curling Challenge tournament.

Summary

Women

References

European youth sports competitions
International curling competitions
Curling in Europe
Recurring sporting events established in 1983
1987 disestablishments
Youth curling